Skjern Handball  is a handball club from Skjern, Denmark. Currently, Skjern Handball competes in the Danish Handball League, which they have won twice, in 1999 and in 2017.  They have also achieved international success, by winning the EHF Challenge Cup twice, in 2002 and 2003. The home arena of Skjern Håndbold is Skjern Bank Arena. This handball club has developed several professional handball players such as Kasper Søndergaard, Jesper Jensen, and Claus Møller Jakobsen.

Kits

Achievements
 Danish Championship: 2
Gold: 1999, 2018
Silver: 2003, 2015, 2017
Bronze: 2006, 2011, 2013, 2019
Danish Handball Cup: 3
Gold: 1999, 2014, 2016
Silver: 1994, 1998, 2003, 2004, 2012, 2022
Danish Super Cup: 1
Gold: 2017
 EHF Cup:
Bronze: 2015
 EHF Challenge Cup: 2
Gold: 2002, 2003

Team

Current squad
Squad for the 2022–23 season

Goalkeepers
 1  Christoffer Bonde
 12  Robin Paulsen Haug
Wingers
LW
 19  Lasse Uth
 23  Jørgen Rasmussen
RW
 17  Mikkel Lang Rasmussen
 21  René Rasmussen 
Pivots
 7  Senjamin Burić
 14  Emil Bergholt (c)

Back players
LB
 9  Simen Holand Pettersen 
 18  Alfred Jönsson
 26  Jonathan Würtz
 76  Tobias Mygind 
CB
 15  Lasse Mikkelsen
 60  Jakob Rasmussen
RB
 5  Oliver Norlyk
 25  Eivind Tangen

Staff
Staff for the 2021–22 season
 Head Coach:  Mathias Madsen
 Assistant Trainer:  Kasper Søndergaard
 Team Leader:  Jørgen Jørgensen
 Physiotherapist:  Hans Jensen

Transfers
Transfers for the 2023–24 season

Joining
  Tim Winkler (GK) (from  KIF Kolding)
  Viktor Bergholt (LW) (from  TM Tønder) 
  Noah Gaudin (CB) (from  SønderjyskE Håndbold)
  Morten Vium (RW) (from  C' Chartres Métropole Handball) 

Leaving
  Robin Paulsen Haug (GK) (to  Elverum Håndball)
  Jørgen Rasmussen (LW)
  Oliver Norlyk (RB) (to  KIF Kolding) 
  Mikkel Lang Rasmussen (RW) (to  Skanderborg Aarhus Håndbold) 

Transfers for the 2024–25 season

Joining

Leaving
  Bjarke Christensen (LW) (from  KIF Kolding)
  Vetle Rønningen (LB) (from  KIF Kolding)

European Handball

EHF Champions League

EHF Cup

EHF Cup Winners' Cup

EHF Challenge Cup

Notable former players
Men

 Claus Møller Jakobsen
 Jesper Jensen
 Michael V. Knudsen
 Lars Møller Madsen
 René Hamann-Boeriths
 Thomas Klitgaard
 Lasse Mikkelsen
 Henrik Møllgaard
 Anders Eggert
 Per Leegaard
 Sune Agerschou
 Rune Ohm
 Daniel Svensson
 Kristian Asmussen
 Lasse Mikkelsen
 Jeppe Riber
 Vignir Svavarsson
 Aron Kristjánsson
 Tibor Ivanišević 
 Markus Olsson

Notable former coaches
 Veroljub Kosovac
 Anders Dahl-Nielsen
 Aron Kristjánsson

References

External links
 
 EHF Profile
 

Danish handball clubs
1992 establishments in Denmark
Handball clubs established in 1992